Nicholas Alexander Subis (born December 24, 1967) is a former American football tackle and center. He played for the Denver Broncos in 1991, the Sacramento Gold Miners in 1993, the Baltimore Stallions from 1994 to 1995 and for the Montreal Alouettes in 1996.

References

1967 births
Living people
American football tackles
American football centers
San Diego State Aztecs football players
Denver Broncos players
Sacramento Gold Miners players
Baltimore Stallions players
Montreal Alouettes players